Werner Lippoldt (born 16 February 1944) is a German former sport shooter who competed in the 1972 Summer Olympics winning a bronze medal.

References

1944 births
Living people
German male sport shooters
ISSF rifle shooters
Olympic shooters of East Germany
Shooters at the 1972 Summer Olympics
Olympic bronze medalists for East Germany
Olympic medalists in shooting
Sportspeople from Ostrava
Medalists at the 1972 Summer Olympics
20th-century German people